Laura Marino (born 2 July 1993) is a French female diver. 

She competed at the 2015 World Aquatics Championships, and the 2016 Summer Olympics.

In 2017, Marino failed to qualify for the individual 10m event but won the gold medal at the World Aquatics Championships along with her partner Matthieu Rosset in the team event with a total of 406.40 points.

See also
France at the 2015 World Aquatics Championships

References

External links
FINA profile
Sports.org Results

French female divers
Living people
1993 births
Divers at the 2016 Summer Olympics
Olympic divers of France
World Aquatics Championships medalists in diving
Sportspeople from Lyon
20th-century French women
21st-century French women